Al-Manshiyya was a Palestinian Arab village in the Tiberias Subdistrict,  located 11 kilometres south of Tiberias. It was probably depopulated at the same time as neighbouring Al-'Ubaydiyya, in  the 1947–1948 Civil War in Mandatory Palestine. Manshiyya was located 1 km south-west of Umm Junieh or Khirbat Umm Juni.

History

Ottoman period
In 1799, in the late  Ottoman period, Um Junieh was noted as "ruins"  on the map of Pierre Jacotin. In 1875, Victor Guérin noted Um Junieh as a village. In the PEF's Survey of Western Palestine in 1881 Umm Junieh was described as having 250 inhabitants, all Muslim. They noted that it was possible that Umm Junieh was the place which Josephus called Union.

In the 1880s the land of  Khirbat Umm Juni and Al-Manshiyya was bought on behalf of the Bahá'u'lláh, the founder of the Baháʼí Faith. The Arab inhabitants continued to farm the land as tenant farmers.  

A population list from about 1887 showed that   Kiryet Umm Juny had  about 330 Muslim inhabitants.

Degania
In 1905-1907 the land was resold to the Jewish National Fund. What were to become Kibbutz Degania was established at Umm Juni, in part using existing Arab-made mud huts and for a while the Arab village  and the Jewish one coexisted.

British Mandate era
In  the 1922 census of Palestine, there were 79 Muslim residents in Khirbat Umm Juneh, while no number is available for Al-Manshiyya.

Post 1948
In 1992 the village site was described: "The site is covered with grasses and a few palm and eucalyptus trees; no traces of buildings remain. The surrounding lands are cultivated by Israelis."

See also
Degania Alef, the "mother of all kibbutzim", was established at Umm Junieh in 1909

References

Bibliography

 (Kh. Um Juni  p. 371)

External links
Welcome to Al-Manshiyya
Manshiyyat Samakh, Zochrot
Survey of Western Palestine, Map 6: IAA, Wikimedia commons

Arab villages depopulated during the 1948 Arab–Israeli War
District of Tiberias